Peter Marcuse (November 13, 1928 – March 4, 2022) was a German-born American lawyer and professor of urban planning.

Biography
Marcuse was the older son of Sophie Wertheim and philosopher and critical theorist Herbert Marcuse. He was born in Berlin, left Germany shortly after Hitler came to power, and immigrated to the U.S. in 1934. He obtained a JD from Yale Law School in 1952 and a PhD from UC Berkeley in city and regional planning in 1972. He began his career as a lawyer in New Haven and Waterbury, Connecticut, where he served as the majority leader of the Board of Aldermen from 1959 to 1963. In July 1964 he participated in the Freedom Summer in Mississippi, publishing a series of articles about his experience there. He was a member of the Waterbury City Plan Commission from 1964 to 1968, and earned Master's degrees from Columbia in public law and government in 1963, and from Yale in urban studies in 1968. In 1972 he completed his Ph.D. at UC Berkeley in city and regional planning, with a thesis on the legal and financial implications of home ownership for low income families. He became a professor of urban planning at UCLA from 1972 to 1975, then at Columbia University from 1975 to 2003. He wrote extensively on gentrification, various forms of ghettoization (imposed ghettos, "enclaves," and "citadels"), the right to the city and the Occupy movement.

Marcuse had three children with his wife Frances (née Bessler): novelist Irene Marcuse (1953-2021), UC Santa Barbara history professor Harold Marcuse (born 1957), and Andrew Marcuse (born 1965). He died on March 4, 2022, at the age of 93.

Books and publications 
 

with James Connolly, Johannes Novy , Ingrid Olivo, Cuz Potter, Justin Steil, Searching for the Just City: Debates in Urban Theory and Practice. Routledge 2009. ISBN 978-0415687614
with Neil Brenner and Margit Mayer, 

"From Utopian and Realistic to Transformative Planning," in: Beatrix Haselsberger, ed. Encounters in Planning Thought: 16 Autobiographical Essays from Key Thinkers in Spatial Planning (Routledge, 2017), pp 35-50.
"From Gerrymandering to Co-Mandering: Redrawing the Lines," in: Andrea Kahn and Carol J. Burns (eds.), Site Matters: Strategies for Uncertainty through Planning and Design (New York: Routledge, 2020), pp. 252-266.
"From Gerrymandering to "Social Mandering", Progressive City Newsletter, June 2021, https://www.progressivecity.net/single-post/from-gerrymandering-to-social-mandering

References

External links 
 Peter Marcuse's personal page at marcuse.org.
 Critical planning and other thoughts Peter Marcuse's blog.

1928 births
2022 deaths
Writers from Berlin
Writers from Connecticut
Jewish emigrants from Nazi Germany to the United States
American urban planners
Yale Law School alumni
UC Berkeley College of Environmental Design alumni
Columbia Graduate School of Architecture, Planning and Preservation faculty
Public housing in the United States
University of California, Los Angeles faculty
Connecticut lawyers
Connecticut city council members
Urban theorists